The Church of the Resurrection is a multi-site, United Methodist megachurch in Kansas City metropolitan area. The original campus is located in Leawood, Kansas, with additional locations in Olathe, Kansas, downtown Kansas City, Missouri, Blue Springs, Missouri and Overland Park, Kansas. It is one of the largest United Methodist congregations in the world and reported a membership of 15,359 in 2020. It maintains 5 campuses and had an average weekly attendance of over 13,000 people in 2019. The United Methodist Saint Paul School of Theology moved its facilities from Kansas City, Missouri, to the Church of the Resurrection in fall of 2013.

The Church of the Resurrection’s founding and senior pastor is Reverend Adam Hamilton. Hamilton started the congregation in 1990. Hamilton is committed to the renewal of the mainline church, especially the United Methodist Church. In 2012 he was invited by the White House to deliver the message at the National Prayer Service as a part of President Obama’s second inauguration.

History 
In 1990, Church of the Resurrection started as a small church with a goal to welcome thinking people not actively involved in a church. Resurrection met for its first worship service in McGilley Funeral Home, with approximately 10 people in attendance. By 1992, attendance grew and the church began meeting at Leawood Elementary School.

They moved into their first permanent sanctuary in the fall of 1994, which is now the Wesley Covenant Chapel. As growth continued, the church constructed a larger sanctuary in 1998 that currently serves as the student center. The continued growth made way for a 3,050-seat sanctuary, an educational wing and prayer chapel in 2004. Live web streaming of worship services began in late 2008 for those unable to worship at a physical location. Since the launch of live streaming, groups around the city and country gather to watch the services online. By 2011, Church of the Resurrection was noted as one of the ‘Top Churches to Watch in America’ and held 24 Candlelight Christmas Eve worship services between its four campuses, with 27,936 people in attendance.

In 2017, the church opened a new sanctuary which seats 3,500 and includes a large stained glass window called The Resurrection Window. The Resurrection Window was designed by Judson Studios to tell the biblical story, capturing themes of scripture including creation, sin, redemption, and restoration. The church now averages an attendance of over 13,000 per weekend.

Image gallery

References

External links
Church of the Resurrection Website
Resurrection Leawood
Resurrection West (Olathe)
Resurrection Downtown
Resurrection Blue Springs
Adam Hamilton's blog
Sacred Spaces Website (information about the church's sacred art and architecture)

Kansas City metropolitan area
Methodist megachurches in the United States
United Methodist churches in Kansas
Christian organizations established in 1990
Churches in Johnson County, Kansas